Francesca Comencini (born 19 August 1961) is an Italian film director and screenwriter. She attended the Lycée français Chateaubriand school with her sisters. She has directed 14 films since 1984. Her film Le parole di mio padre was screened in the Un Certain Regard section at the 2001 Cannes Film Festival. In 2012, her film Un Giorno Speciale was selected to compete for the Golden Lion at the 69th Venice International Film Festival. She was married to French producer Daniel Toscan du Plantier.

Filmography
 Pianoforte (1984)
 La lumière du lac (1988)
 Annabelle partagée (1991)
 Elsa Morante (1997)
 Le parole di mio padre (2001)
 Un altro mondo è possibile (2001)
 Carlo Giuliani, ragazzo (2002)
 Firenze, il nostro domani (2003)
 Mi piace lavorare - Mobbing (2004)
 Visions of Europe (2004)
 A casa nostra (2006)
 In fabbrica (2007)
 L'Aquila 2009 - Cinque registi tra le macerie (2009)
 Lo spazio bianco (2009)
 Un Giorno Speciale (2012)
 Gomorra - La serie (from 2014) (TV series)
 Amori che non sanno stare al mondo (2017)
Django (TV series) (also creative director) (2023)

References

External links

1961 births
Living people
Italian film directors
Italian screenwriters
Writers from Rome